Caldecote is a village in Northamptonshire, England, about  north of Towcester .

References

External links

Villages in Northamptonshire
West Northamptonshire District